Richard Lindsay Dowden (1932–2016), sometimes known as Dick Dowden, was an Australian-born New Zealand-resident scientist and researcher, and a recognised authority within the fields of geo- and astrophysics.

Education
Dowden was educated at Saint Ignatius' College, Riverview and later studied science at the University of Sydney, graduating with a Bachelor of Science Honours degree in 1955.  He subsequently undertook research studies with the University of Tasmania, graduating with a Master of Science in 1959, a PhD in 1965, and a Doctor of Science in 1975.

Career
Dowden served as a scientist with the Radiophysics Division of the CSIRO, as a scientist on Macquarie Island, and as a scientist with the Ionic Prediction Service in Hobart.  He served as an academic with the University of Tasmania and Otago University, where he was appointed Beverly Professor of Physics. In the course of his career, Dowden made numerous research journeys to both the Arctic and Antarctic regions.

The research from Dowden was extensive. Areas of research included electromagnetic theory and detection techniques, the polarity and longitude of the dipole axis of Jupiter, very low frequency emissions, the dynamic spectral shape of electrons in electromagnetic radiation, high frequency ionospheric sounders; very low frequency modulation of the auroral electrojet; detection and interpretation of red sprites; invention of the dynagraph; and Jupiter polarmetrics.

Dowden authored or co-authored some 119 scientific monographs.

Recognition
The work of Richard Dowden was recognised with the awards of the Michaelis Medal, the Sidey Medal, and the Australian Antarctic Division Medal. Dowden was made a Fellow of the New Zealand Institute of Physics, a Fellow of the Royal Society of New Zealand, and a Fellow of the American Geophysical Union. The Otago Daily Times, in its obituary for Dowden, described him as an "award-winning researcher" and an "influential teacher".

References

1932 births
2016 deaths
Scientists from Dunedin
University of Sydney alumni
University of Tasmania alumni
Academic staff of the University of Tasmania
Academic staff of the University of Otago
People educated at Saint Ignatius' College, Riverview
Australian astrophysicists
Australian geophysicists
Australian people of Greek descent
Greek emigrants to New Zealand
Australian emigrants to New Zealand
New Zealand physicists
Fellows of the Royal Society of New Zealand
CSIRO people
Fellows of the American Geophysical Union